Verkhnyaya Kolva is a rural locality (a settlement) in Cherdynsky District, Perm Krai, Russia. The population was 542 as of 2010. There are 5 streets.

Geography 
Verkhnyaya Kolva is located 171 km northeast of Cherdyn (the district's administrative centre) by road. Gadya is the nearest rural locality.

References 

Rural localities in Cherdynsky District